Grevillea dryandroides, commonly known as phalanx grevillea, is a species of flowering plant in the family Proteaceae and is endemic to the south-west of Western Australia. A diffuse, clumping shrub, it often forms suckers and has divided leaves with up to 35 pairs of leaflets, and groups of red to pinkish flowers on an unusually long, trailing peduncle.

Description
The style has shaggy hairs near its base.

Taxonomy
Grevillea dryandroides was first formally described in 1933 by Charles Gardner in the Journal of the Royal Society of Western Australia from material he collected near Ballidu in 1931. The specific epithet (dryandroides) means "Dryandra-like".

In 1993, Peter M. Olde and Neil R. Marriott described two subspecies of G. dryandroides in the journal Nuytsia and the names are accepted by the Australian Plant Census:

Distribution and habitat
Phalanyx grevillea grows in open heath and woodland and is restricted to the Avon Wheatbelt biogeographic region of south-western Western Australia. Subspecies dryandroides grows near Ballidu and subsp. hirsuta between Cadoux and Corrigin.

Conservation status
Grevillea dryandroides is listed as "not threatened" by the Western Australian Government Department of Biodiversity, Conservation and Attractions, but both subspecies are listed as "threatened" meaning that they are in danger of extinction.

References

dryandroides
Proteales of Australia
Flora of Western Australia
Plants described in 1933
Taxa named by Charles Gardner